Tedd Williams (born December 19, 1969) is an American former mixed martial arts fighter and promoter, who has promoted Gladiator Challenge since its inception in 2000.

Background
Williams attended Cerritos College, obtaining an associate degree in criminal justice. During his junior year in Cerritos, Williams was a runner-up in wrestling in the state championships.

After graduating from the community college, Williams went to the military, stationed in Fort Ord and served as a part of the 7th Infantry Division. He served from 1990 to 1992, but was never deployed to participate in the Gulf War.

Coming out of the military service, Williams moved to Hesperia, California in seek of a combat sport involving grappling. After failing to find one he founded his own school and started offering training in a sport he called combat grappling. Eventually, he competed in what is nowadays known as mixed martial arts, including appearances at UFC 24 and UFC 27. Right after he lost his final fight against Ian Freeman, he started his own promotion, Gladiator Challenge.

Personal life
Williams and his wife Ceci have four sons and a daughter. Besides promoting Gladiator Challenge events, Williams works as a wrestling coach at Excelsior Charter School in Victorville, California.

Mixed martial arts record

|-
| Loss
| align=center| 7–1
| Ian Freeman
| Decision (unanimous)
| UFC 27
| 
| align=center| 3
| align=center| 5:00
| New Orleans, Louisiana, United States
| 
|-
| Win
| align=center| 7–0
| Bill Parker
| Submission (armlock)
| KOTC 4 - Gladiators
| 
| align=center| 1
| align=center| 0:32
| San Jacinto, California
| 
|-
| Win
| align=center| 6–0
| Steve Judson
| TKO (punches)
| UFC 24
| 
| align=center| 1
| align=center| 3:23
| Lake Charles, Louisiana, United States
| 
|-
| Win
| align=center| 5–0
| Bull Shaw
| Decision
| HFP  - Holiday Fight Party
| 
| align=center| 1
| align=center| 20:00
| 
| 
|-
| Win
| align=center| 4–0
| Joe Campanella
| Submission (keylock)
| WEF 7 - Stomp in the Swamp
| 
| align=center| 1
| align=center| 1:48
| Louisiana, United States
| 
|-
| Win
| align=center| 3–0
| Travis Fulton
| Decision (unanimous)
| LI - Lionheart Invitational
| 
| align=center| 1
| align=center| 20:00
| Georgia, United States
| 
|-
| Win
| align=center| 2–0
| Joseph Marquez
| Submission (palm strikes)
| BRI 3 - Bas Rutten Invitational 3
| 
| align=center| 1
| align=center| 1:50
| Colorado, United States
| 
|-
| Win
| align=center| 1–0
| Robert Burnell
| Submission
| ESF - Empire One
| 
| align=center| 1
| align=center| 1:23
| California, United States
|

References

External links

1969 births
Living people
American male mixed martial artists
Mixed martial artists utilizing judo
Mixed martial artists utilizing collegiate wrestling
Ultimate Fighting Championship male fighters
American male sport wrestlers
Amateur wrestlers
American male judoka